Mohammed Surti is a leader of Indian National Congress  from Surat in Gujarat. He was a government minister of Gujarat. He was falsely convicted for  his involvement in 1993 Surat bomb blasts and was imprisoned, he was proven innocent and acquitted after spending 12 years in prison.

In October 2008, a TADA court in Surat sentenced Mohammad Surti to 20 years in prison. Later on 18 July 2014, The Supreme Court acquitted all the 11 accused convicted for 1993 Surat bomb blast including Surti.

See also 

 Communalism (South Asia)
 Religious violence in India
 Nationalist terrorism
 Terrorism in India

References

People from Surat
Indian politicians convicted of crimes
Living people
Gujarat MLAs 1980–1985
Indian prisoners and detainees
Crime in Gujarat
Indian Muslims
Indian National Congress politicians
Year of birth missing (living people)
Indian National Congress politicians from Gujarat